U.S. Route 42 (US 42) is an east–west United States highway that runs southwest–northeast for  from Louisville, Kentucky to Cleveland, Ohio.  The route has several names including Pearl Road from Cleveland to Medina in Northeast Ohio, Reading Road in Cincinnati, Cincinnati and Lebanon Pike in southwestern Ohio and Brownsboro Road in Louisville. Traveling northeast, the highway ends in downtown Cleveland and traveling southwest ends in Louisville.

Interstate 71 (I-71) fully supplanted US 42 as an interurban highway in the early 1960s, relegating US 42 to its current role as an ordinary town-to-town surface road. Additionally, I-71 passes through Columbus, where US 42 avoids Columbus completely. It remains intact as a route; no part of it has ever been diverted to any Interstate highway. It is not the "parent" of any US route with a related number.

In spite of its even number, US 42 is posted north–south in Ohio.

Route description

Kentucky

U.S. Route 42 starts in Louisville, Kentucky, heading northeast through Prospect on the Oldham County and Jefferson County line. From here US 42 is a two lane road passing through the northern Kentucky hills paralleling between Interstate 71 and the Ohio River. Next, it passes through Goshen near North Oldham High School, situated on the north side. US 42 continues through Oldham County into Trimble County. In Bedford US 42 intersects with US 421 and is concurrent through downtown. The route still heading northeast crosses into Carroll County prior to crossing the Kentucky River and entering Carrollton. US 42 follows northeast along the south bank of the Ohio River passing Markland Lock and Dam and KY 1039 Markland Dam Bridge which connects between Kentucky Speedway and Indiana. Heading east US 42 parallels the Ohio River passing through Warsaw, Gallatin County about  prior to intersecting with US 127 starting an extended concurrency. US 127 heads south toward Glencoe, Owenton, and eventually Frankfort.

From the intersection with US 127, US 42 turns away from the Ohio River bank. US 42 enters Boone County about  prior to intersecting with the western terminus of Kentucky Route 14 (KY 14). Continuing north US 42-127 in about  intersects Beaver Road KY 338 creating a wrong-way concurrency between US 127 and KY 338: when going north, drivers are traveling east on US 42, north on US 127, and south on Kentucky 338. This continues for less than a mile until it intersects with Richwood Pike where KY 338 splits off continuing south.

Continuing north for several miles the US 42-127 intersects with KY 536 (Mount Zion Road). Prior to KY 536 Ryle High School sits on the road's west side. Just south of Ryle, US 42 turns from a two-lane country road to a five-lane road. US 42 passes through Union prior to continuing to the northeast with US 127. After a couple of miles, it crosses Interstate 71/Interstate 75. Entering Florence US 42 intersects with KY 842 and KY 237. Within Florence US 25 Dixie Highway joins in a concurrency with US 42-127 which takes on the name Dixie Highway. After crossing briefly into Elsmere, the route enters Erlanger. US 42 becomes almost entirely a commercial road for the duration of its length in Erlanger. Prior to leaving Erlanger, US 42 becomes narrower and more congested after it crosses KY 236.

US 42 is primarily a commercial road prior to crossing under I-275 and proceeds to turn back into an almost purely residential road with a few exceptions while going north. The route intersects with KY 1303 (Turkeyfoot Road) northern terminus. The Crestview Hills town center lies just south of I-275 on the east side of the road, between Dixie Highway and Turkeyfoot Road. Dixie Heights High School is less than a mile down the road on the western side. After crossing I-71/I-75 again the road heads in a northeast direction closely parallel to I-71/I-75. As it heads north US 42 starts off mostly as a residential road, turning more and more into a commercial road.

As it winds down from the suburbs into Covington the highway's name changes from Dixie Highway to Pike Street prior to crossing I-71/I-75 again. US 25-42-127 turns left on Main St heading north and crossing KY 8. US 42 crosses into Ohio from Covington on the Clay Wade Bailey Bridge, together with US 25 and US 127.

Ohio

It is classified as 59.3% rural and 40.7% urban, with only  coded as freeway (while running concurrently with US 23 in Delaware). The route begins in Cincinnati, then passes through Hamilton, Butler, Warren, Greene, Clark, Madison, Union, Delaware, Morrow, Richland, Ashland, Wayne and Medina, Cuyahoga counties prior to reaching its terminus in Cleveland.

US 42 crosses into Cincinnati from Covington, Kentucky, on the Clay Wade Bailey Bridge, together with US 127. US 42 heads northeast out of Cincinnati on Reading Road, which runs between I-71 and I-75. In 2020, the Cincinnati City Council approved a project to rename Reading Road to President Barack Obama Avenue from Downtown Cincinnati to Reading, pending private donations; all 30,000 signs are expected to be installed by September 2021. Reading Road intersects with I-275, then briefly enters Butler County. The Ohio Department of Transportation has given this portion of US 42 the name Columbus–Cincinnati Road, but it is locally known as Cincinnati–Columbus Road, a name that also appears on West Chester Township signs along the road.

The portion of US 42 in Warren County between Lebanon and Waynesville is designated "Sergeant Brian Dulle Memorial Highway", in honor of a Warren County Sheriff's deputy who was struck and killed along US 42 on May 10, 2011 by a stolen car, while he was laying out stop sticks to catch the driver.

The intersection with Spring Valley–Paintersville Road in Spring Valley Township, Greene County near the village of Spring Valley has been the site of numerous fail-to-yield accidents, including a double fatality in 2017. In October 2018, the Ohio Department of Transportation announced that it would convert the intersection into a "basic RCUT", which would add a median and replace all left turns with right-in/right-out turns and median U-turns. The project is expected to cost around $1.2 million and begin in late 2020.

In Xenia, the intersection of US 42 (North Columbus Street) and East Church Street, where US 42 formerly continued at an awkward angle, was converted to a roundabout on June 12, 2020, at a cost of approximately $1.1 million. After leaving Xenia, major cities along the route are London, Delaware, Mansfield, Ashland and Medina prior to reaching the Cleveland metropolitan area. In London US 42 intersects with I-70. Other than a short concurrency at each end, in Delaware are the only other two concurrencies with US routes. Entering Delaware from the south US 42 runs concurrent with US 23 in Delaware until the junction with US 36 which it follows east for about  before turning back to the north. The  concurrence with US 23 is the only stretch of US 42 that is categorized as a freeway in Ohio.

Heading into Cuyahoga County at Strongsville, US 42 intersects I-80, the Ohio Turnpike, and continues through Middleburg Heights, Parma Heights, and Parma heading into Cleveland and is known locally as Pearl Road. US 42 continues north intersecting with I-71 and nearby exits to I-90. The route is part of the Ohio & Erie Canalway Scenic Byway while continuing north on West 25th. At this point on the route the road is a business district surrounded by varying business and residents of the Ohio City neighborhood. Along this stretch of the route, can be found many historic buildings, including the West Side Market. The last stretch of US 42 is a concurrency with US 6.

The eastern/northern end of US 42 finds its terminus at the intersection of Superior Avenue and Ontario Street in the middle of Public Square in downtown Cleveland. This intersection also serves as the western terminus of US 322 coming from the east on Superior as well as the western termini of US 422, Ohio State Route 14 (SR 14), and SR 87 and the northern terminus of SR 8 coming from the south on Ontario.

Major intersections

See also
List of United States Numbered Highways
Roads in Louisville, Kentucky

References

External links

 Endpoints of U.S. Highway 42

 
42
42
0042
Transportation in Jefferson County, Kentucky
Transportation in Oldham County, Kentucky
Transportation in Henry County, Kentucky
Transportation in Trimble County, Kentucky
Transportation in Carroll County, Kentucky
Transportation in Gallatin County, Kentucky
Transportation in Boone County, Kentucky
Transportation in Kenton County, Kentucky
Transportation in Hamilton County, Ohio
Transportation in Butler County, Ohio
Transportation in Warren County, Ohio
Transportation in Greene County, Ohio
Transportation in Clark County, Ohio
Transportation in Madison County, Ohio
Transportation in Union County, Ohio
Transportation in Delaware County, Ohio
Transportation in Morrow County, Ohio
Transportation in Richland County, Ohio
Transportation in Ashland County, Ohio
Transportation in Wayne County, Ohio
Transportation in Medina County, Ohio
Transportation in Cuyahoga County, Ohio
42